Heath Township may refer to the following places in the United States:

 Heath Township, Michigan
 Heath Township, Jefferson County, Pennsylvania

Township name disambiguation pages